The Dayton Dynamo was a professional indoor soccer team from Dayton, Ohio. The team played in the American Indoor Soccer Association (AISA).

Founded by former University of Dayton and Central State University coach Jerry Butcher, the Dynamo joined the AISA as one of two expansion franchises (the other being the Jacksonville Generals) playing in the 1987–88 post-season "Challenge Cup" Series. The franchise began regular-season play at Hara Arena starting with the 1988–89 season and moved to the Ervin J. Nutter Center at Wright State University for the 1990–91 season.  The Dynamo played its last two seasons in Dayton at the 4,600 seat capacity Dayton Convention Center.

The Dynamo finished last in the league during the team's first two seasons. In the 1989–90 season, the Dynamo won the National Division, but the squad lost to the Canton Invaders of Canton, Ohio, in the championship series. The team returned to the championship round the following season, losing to the Chicago Power this time. During the 1991–92 season, the Dynamo, now in the National Professional Soccer League's American Division, finished last. Over the next three seasons, the team finished no higher than fifth in its division. Declining support from Dayton fans prompted the Dynamo to relocate to Cincinnati, Ohio, at the end of the 1994–95 season. The move also prompted a name change and the squad became known as the Cincinnati Silverbacks.

In 2015, the Cincinnati Saints announced that they would relocate to Dayton and operate as an outdoor team renamed in honor of the old indoor team for the 2016 season.

Dynamo year-by-year

Silverbacks year-by-year
See: Cincinnati Silverbacks

References

Soccer in Dayton, Ohio
Soccer clubs in Ohio
Defunct indoor soccer clubs in the United States
National Professional Soccer League (1984–2001) teams
Association football clubs established in 1989
1989 establishments in Ohio
Association football clubs disestablished in 1995
1995 disestablishments in Ohio